South Wood County Airport , also known as Alexander Field, is a public use airport located one nautical mile (1.85 km) south of the central business district of Wisconsin Rapids, a city in Wood County, Wisconsin, United States.

The airport is owned and operated by the City of Wisconsin Rapids, the Village of Port Edwards, the Town of Grand Rapids and the City of Nekoosa. It is included in the Federal Aviation Administration (FAA) National Plan of Integrated Airport Systems for 2021–2025, in which it is categorized as a local general aviation facility.

History
Alexander Field was built for Nekoosa Edwards Paper Company subsidiary Tri-Cities Airways in October 1928 and named after its executive John Alexander. Governor Fred R. Zimmerman and Walter J. Kohler opened the airport with an airshow that featured air-to-air refueling. A Ford Trimotor was based at the field and was used for company business and community events. During World War II, the airfield saw service as a National Guard station and POW camp for German prisoners. In 1961 the ownership was transferred to Wood County.

Facilities and aircraft 
It has three runways:
 Runway 2/20: 5,500 by 100 feet (1,676 x 30 m), asphalt, GPS, SDF, and NDB equipped approaches.
 Runway 12/30: 3,470 by 60 feet (1,058 x 18 m), asphalt, approved NDB approach.
 Runway 18/36: 2,072 by 50 feet (632 x 15 m), turf
 
Wisconsin Rapids (ISW) non-directional beacon, 215 kHz, is located on field.

For the 12-month period ending May 20, 2021, the airport had 11,550 aircraft operations, an average of 32 per day: 91% general aviation, 9% air taxi and less than 1% military. In February 2023, there were 32 aircraft based at this airport: 28 single-engine and 4 multi-engine.

See also
 List of airports in Wisconsin

References

External links 
  at Wisconsin DOT Airports Directory
 The Alexander Field Airport commission is the fixed-base operator (FBO)
 

 http://www.wingsaircharter.com Wings Air Charter LLC provides aircraft charter, flight instruction, and aircraft rental at Alexander Field. They also have hangar space for most size aircraft.

Airports in Wisconsin
Buildings and structures in Wood County, Wisconsin
Airports established in 1928
1928 establishments in Wisconsin
Wisconsin Rapids, Wisconsin